William M. "Sonny" Landham III (February 11, 1941 – August 17, 2017) was an American actor and stunt performer. He portrayed Billy Bear in 48 Hrs. and tracker Billy Sole in Predator.

Early life and education
Landham was born February 11, 1941, in Canton, Georgia, and raised in Rome, Georgia. He identified as being of half Cherokee and one-eighth Seminole descent, and partly of German, English and Irish descent. He also stated he had Jewish heritage. Landham had at least one sibling, a sister, Dawn.

He attended Saint Mary's Catholic School and Darlington School before playing football for a year at the University of Georgia. Subsequently, he graduated from Oglethorpe University. After college, he did a stint in the army, worked in an oil field, as an ordained Baptist minister, and a model.

Career

Acting career
Landham studied acting for two years at Pasadena Playhouse before moving to New York in 1968 to pursue a career in acting. At the beginning of his acting career, Landham was an actor in pornographic films. He also posed for nude layout for Playgirl. He then became a mainstream movie actor and appeared in a number of Hollywood films, including The Warriors (1979) as a subway policeman whose leg gets broken by a baseball bat-wielding Michael Beck, 48 Hrs. (1982), Predator (1987), Action Jackson (1988), and Lock Up (1989).

Politics
In 2003, Landham ran in the Republican Party primary election for the post of Governor of Kentucky, hoping to repeat the success of his Predator castmates Minnesota Governor Jesse Ventura and California Governor Arnold Schwarzenegger. He based his candidacy on opposition to an amendment which endorsed the Kentucky Family Court, saying his bad experiences at the hands of the family court had convinced him it was for the benefit of lawyers rather than families or children. He was unsuccessful in gaining the party's nomination. He ran briefly as an independent candidate, but withdrew on June 18, 2003, and endorsed the Republican slate.

In January 2004, Landham announced his candidacy for the 27th State Senate District of Kentucky. That year he was the keynote speaker at the official launch part of the radio show, The Political Cesspool. In 2005, Landham spoke at the Council of Conservative Citizens (CofCC) convention.

On June 25, 2008, Landham announced his candidacy for the U.S. Senate seat held by Mitch McConnell, as a Libertarian.

On July 23, 2008, Landham appeared on the political radio show The Weekly Filibuster, where he was asked, in relation to past comments of his quoted in the Louisville Courier-Journal, if he was calling for the genocide of Arab people. He replied, "I call for outright bombing them back into the sand until they surrender and if they don’t surrender, then you continue the war. Because if you don’t, you will never have peace in the United States. Now do you want peace in the United States or do you want to live to some utopian ideals that are impossible in a world?" He further called for Arabs to be banned from entering the United States, and referred that ethnic group as "camel dung-shovelers", and when questioned on this, suggested using the epithets "rag-heads" and "camel jockeys". On July 28, the Kentucky Libertarian Party asked Landham to withdraw his nomination, citing those comments and explaining that his politics did not agree with their platform and values.

Personal life
Landham was married five times. He had four children, including a son named William, and a daughter named Priscilla.

After being convicted on federal charges of making threatening and obscene phone calls to his wife, Landham spent three years in prison. However the U.S. Sixth Circuit Court of Appeals reversed the conviction in May 2001.

On September 19, 2006, Landham was injured in a four-car accident in Ashland, Kentucky.

Death
Landham died on August 17, 2017, aged 76, from congestive heart failure.

Filmography

Film

Television

References

External links
 
 

1941 births
2017 deaths
American actor-politicians
American male pornographic film actors
American male television actors
Kentucky Republicans
Kentucky Independents
Kentucky Libertarians
People from Canton, Georgia
Male actors from Georgia (U.S. state)
Council of Conservative Citizens
American stunt performers
Darlington School alumni
American people of Cherokee descent
American people of English descent
American people of German descent
American people of Irish descent
American people of Seminole descent